Fatwell Kimaiyo (born 1 July 1947) is a Kenyan former track and field athlete who competed in the 110 metres hurdles and 400 metres hurdles.

Born in Kapchemoiywo Kapsabet, Nandi County, he enlisted with the Kenya Police-General Service Unit in 1966 and retired as Senior Sergeant in 1978. He studied in the United States at the University of New Mexico in Albuquerque Worked as Games Tutor/Coach in 'Rift Valley Technology Institute, Kenya Power, Kenyatta University, Moi University and University of Eldoret formerly Chepkoilel Campus.' Coached known elite athlete Tecla Lorupe and others

He competed in the 1972 Summer Olympics, the 1974 Commonwealth Games, 1973 All-Africa Games and the 1978 All-Africa Games. He was the gold medallist at both the African Games and at the Commonwealth Games. He also participated in the 1975 Afro Latin Games and the East and Central Africa Games.

Married to Katherine Serem with 5 children Ibrahim Kiptanui Maiyo, Late Stephen Kimutai Maiyo, Paul Kipkirui Kosgei, Naomie Jepkogei and Laban Kiptoo Maiyo. He currently works as a farmer and a Coach in [Kapsabet and Eldoret], Kenya. He is also a member of Athletics Kenya in Kenya.

External links 
 
 

1947 births
Living people
Kenyan police officers
Kenyan male hurdlers
Olympic athletes of Kenya
Athletes (track and field) at the 1972 Summer Olympics
Athletes (track and field) at the 1974 British Commonwealth Games
Athletes (track and field) at the 1978 Commonwealth Games
Commonwealth Games gold medallists for Kenya
Commonwealth Games medallists in athletics
People from Nandi County
African Games gold medalists for Kenya
African Games medalists in athletics (track and field)
Athletes (track and field) at the 1973 All-Africa Games
Athletes (track and field) at the 1978 All-Africa Games
Medallists at the 1974 British Commonwealth Games